Chiococceae is a tribe of flowering plants in the family Rubiaceae and contains about 233 species in 27 genera. Most representatives occur from southern Florida to tropical and subtropical America, except for the genera Badusa and Bikkia, which are found from the Philippines to the West Pacific, and Morierina and Thiollierea, which are native to New Caledonia.

Genera 
Currently accepted names

 Badusa A.Gray (3 sp)
 Bikkia Reinw. ex Blume (10 sp)
 Catesbaea L. (17 sp)
 Ceratopyxis Hook.f. (1 sp)
 Ceuthocarpus Aiello (1 sp)
 Chiococca P.Browne (25 sp)
 Coutaportla Urb. (3 sp)
 Coutarea Aubl. (6 sp)
 Cubanola Aiello (2 sp)
 Eosanthe Urb. (1 sp)
 Erithalis P.Browne (8 sp)
 Exostema (Pers.) Rich. ex Humb. & Bonpl. (43 sp)
 Hintonia Bullock (3 sp)
 Isidorea A.Rich ex DC. (17 sp)
 Morierina Vieill. (2 sp)
 Nernstia Urb. (1 sp)
 Osa Aiello (1 sp)
 Phialanthus Griseb. (22 sp)
 Phyllacanthus Hook.f. (1 sp)
 Portlandia P.Browne (6 sp)
 Salzmannia DC. (1 sp)
 Schmidtottia Urb. (15 sp)
 Scolosanthus Vahl (27 sp)
 Shaferocharis Urb. (3 sp)
 Siemensia Urb. (1 sp)
 Solenandra Hook.f. (21 spp.)
 Thogsennia Aiello (1 sp)
 Thiollierea Montrouz. (12 sp)

Synonyms

 Antacanthus Rich. ex DC. = Scolosanthus
 Asemnantha Hook.f. = Chiococca
 Bathysograya Kuntze = Badusa
 Bikkiopsis Brongn. & Gris = Bikkia
 Cormigonus Raf. = Bikkia
 Cutaria Brign. = Coutarea
 Dolichanthera Schltr. & K.Krause = Morierina
 Echinodendrum A.Rich. = Scolosanthus
 Gonianthes Rich. = Cubanola
 Herrera Adans. = Exostema
 Lorencea Borhidi = Coutaportla
 Solenandra Hook.f. = Exostema
 Steudelago Kuntze = Exostema

External links
World Checklist of Rubiaceae
Manns, U., and B. Bremer. 2010. Towards a better understanding of intertribal relationships and stable tribal delimitations within Cinchonoideae s.s. (Rubiaceae). Molecular Phylogenetics and Evolution 56: 21-39
Motley, T. J., K. J. Wurdack, and P. G. Delprete. 2005. Molecular systematics of the Catesbaeeae-Chiococceae complex (Rubiaceae) - flower and fruit evolution and biogeographic implications. American Journal of Botany 92: 316-329
Paudyal, S. K., P. G. Delprete, and T. J. Motley. 2014. Using Molecular, Morphological, and Palynological Evidence to Transfer Strumpfia maritima to the Monotypic Tribe Strumpfieae (Cinchonoideae, Rubiaceae), and a Re-delimitation of the Tribe Chiococceae. Systematic Botany 39(4):1197-1203.

 
Cinchonoideae tribes